Bereg Kamy is a rural locality (a village) in Yugo-Kamskoye Rural Settlement, Permsky District, Perm Krai, Russia. The population was 23 as of 2010. There are 3  streets.

Geography 
It is located 9 km south-west from Yugo-Kamsky.

References 

Rural localities in Permsky District